Business.govt.nz is the New Zealand Government's online resource for small business, bringing together information from across the public and private sectors, packaged into tools and resources designed with small businesses in mind. It aims to make succeeding in business easier for New Zealand businesses.

Business.govt.nz is managed and maintained by a dedicated team working in the New Zealand Ministry of Business, Innovation and Employment.

Background

The previous government business site, biz.org.nz, was launched in 2003. Business.govt.nz replaced it on 15 August 2007. The site was originally developed by New Zealand Trade and Enterprise in consultation with a range of government departments and ministries, business groups and business service providers.

In 2014, business.govt.nz adopted a policy of customer-centred design and delivery, developing all new products in partnership with designers and small businesses, testing all ideas, concepts and prototypes with small businesses. At the same time continuous business improvement practices were implemented.

Business.govt.nz tools and resources
Business.govt.nz focuses on topics and issues that cause small businesses the most problems, or have the potential to create the greatest positive impact. Business topics covered by the site include:

 getting Started
how to grow
tax and accounting
hiring and managing people
risks and operations
business performance

Users and growth
Business.govt.nz's tools and website content is used primarily by small New Zealand businesses and business advisors.

Following the adoption of customer-led design practices in 2014, business.govt.nz's usage has increased. In October 2018 the website recorded over 318,000 user sessions with an average session time of 4 minutes 15 seconds, amounting to 1.3 million minutes on the site; in October 2014 the site recorded just over 100,000 sessions with an average duration of 2 minutes 20 seconds.

Over 350,000 small businesses receive the business.govt.nz newsletter each month. In October 2018 over 96,000 businesses opened this newsletter.

References

Government of New Zealand
Economy of New Zealand
Government services portals